Digha is a census town in the Barasat I CD block in the Barasat Sadar subdivision in the North 24 Parganas district in the Indian state of West Bengal. It is a part of Kolkata Urban Agglomeration.

Geography

Location

Bamangachhi, Digha and Kulberia form a cluster of census towns. The entire cluster has a very high density of population. (See the infobox of each census town for density of population).

Duttapukur police station has jurisdiction over Barasat I CD Block.

Area overview
The area covered in the map alongside is largely a part of the north Bidyadhari Plain. located in the lower Ganges Delta. The country is flat. It is a little raised above flood level and the highest ground borders the river channels.54.67% of the people of the densely populated area lives in the urban areas and 45.33% lives in the rural  areas.

Note: The map alongside presents some of the notable locations in the subdivision. All places marked in the map are linked in the larger full screen map.

Demographics
 India census, Digha had a population of 8,159; of this, 4,162 are male, 3,997 female. It has an average literacy rate of 73.2%, lower than the national average of 74.04%.

Infrastructure
As per District Census Handbook 2011, Digha covered an area of 1.3969 km2. It had 2 primary schools, the nearest middle school, secondary school and senior secondary school were 0.5 km away at Sikdarpukuria, and the nearest degree college was 7 km away at Barasat. The nearest dispensary/ health centre (without any bed) was available 1 km away.

Transport
Digha is on National Highway 112 (Jessore Road).

The Duttapukur railway station on the Sealdah-Bangaon line, which is part of the Kolkata Suburban Railway railway system and is located nearby.

Healthcare
There is a primary health centre at Duttapukur.

North 24 Parganas district has been identified as one of the areas where ground water is affected by arsenic contamination.

See also
Map of Barasat I CD Block on Page 393 of District Census Handbook.

References

Cities and towns in North 24 Parganas district